These are the official results of the Women's 100 metres hurdles event at the 1990 European Championships in Split, Yugoslavia, held at Stadion Poljud on 29 and 30 August 1990.

Medalists

Results

Final
30 August
Wind: -0.9 m/s

Semi-finals
29 August

Semi-final 1
Wind: 0.3 m/s

Semi-final 2
Wind: 1.1 m/s

Heats
29 August

Heat 1
Wind: 0.5 m/s

Heat 2
Wind: 0.2 m/s

Heat 3
Wind: -0.8 m/s

Participation
According to an unofficial count, 20 athletes from 10 countries participated in the event.

 (1)
 (1)
 (3)
 (3)
 (1)
 (3)
 (2)
 (3)
 (2)
 (1)

See also
 1988 Women's Olympic 100m Hurdles (Seoul)
 1991 Women's World Championships 100m Hurdles (Tokyo)
 1992 Women's Olympic 100m Hurdles (Barcelona)

References

External links
 Results

Hurdles 100
Sprint hurdles at the European Athletics Championships
1990 in women's athletics